Fleming's Prime Steakhouse & Wine Bar (or simply Fleming's) is an American steakhouse restaurant chain owned and operated by Bloomin' Brands, headquartered in Tampa, Florida. In addition to steak and wine, they serve a variety of American cuisine associated with fine dining, such as calamari, chocolate desserts, crab, lobster, and other seasonal specials. The Fleming’s 100 is a brand trademark that consists of a collection of 100 wines available by the glass or bottle.

History
Founded in 1998 by Paul Fleming and Bill Allen, Fleming's first location was in Newport Beach, California.

In 2020, Fleming's was one of the many restaurant chains impacted by the COVID-19 pandemic.

As of 2021, the company had 64 locations throughout 26 states and 1 in São Paulo, Brazil, all company-owned.

External links
 
 OSI Restaurant Partners, LLC website

References

Companies based in Newport Beach, California
Restaurants established in 1998
1998 establishments in California
Restaurant chains in the United States
Steakhouses in the United States
Bloomin' Brands
Companies based in Tampa, Florida
American companies established in 1998